Marius Vasilică Țincu (born 7 April 1978 in Vânători, Iași) is a Romanian former rugby union footballer. He played as a hooker. Since 2007, he has held dual French-Romanian citizenship.

He was first noticed in Romania, but soon moved to France, where he already played for Rouen, La Teste, Section Paloise (until 2005). He played for USA Perpignan, from the 2005-06 Top 14.

Tincu played his first game for Romania on 3 February 2002 against Portugal.

He played in four games at the 2007 Rugby World Cup, scoring three tries, in the games against Italy, Portugal and the New Zealand. He also competed at the 2011 Rugby World Cup.

Honours

Club

USA Perpignan
 Top 14
 Champion: 2009
 Runner-up: 2010

International
Romania
European Nations Cup (2): 2001–02, 2004–06

Notes

1978 births
Living people
Romanian rugby union players
Rugby union hookers
CS Universitatea Cluj-Napoca (rugby union) players
Section Paloise players
USA Perpignan players
Romania international rugby union players
Romanian expatriate rugby union players
Expatriate rugby union players in France
Romanian expatriate sportspeople in France